The Cimarron-class oilers were an underway replenishment class of oil tankers which were first built in 1939 as "National Defense Tankers," United States Maritime Commission Type T3-S2-A1, designed "to conform to the approved characteristics for naval auxiliaries in speed, radius and structural strength", anticipating their militarization in the event of war. "Tentative plans had been reached with the Standard Oil Company of New Jersey to build ten high-speed tankers with the government paying the cost of the larger engines needed for increased speed. By the first week in December [1937], Standard Oil had solicited and received bids from a number of yards providing for the construction of a number of 16,300-ton (deadweight) capacity tankers. Bids were requested for two versions: a single-screw design of 13 knots and a twin-screw design of 18 knots. The price difference between the two would be used to establish the government's cost subsidy for greater speed. Plans and specifications for both designs were prepared for Standard Oil by naval architect E. L. Stewart. It seems certain that the design for the 18-knot tanker (Standard Oil Co. of New Jersey Design No. 652 NDF) evolved out of the bureau's (C&R) design for a fleet oiler."

Three of the original twelve ships were commissioned directly into the Navy at launch in 1939; the remainder entered merchant service with Standard Oil of New Jersey and Keystone Tankships before being acquired under the Two-Ocean Navy Act of July 1940. A further eighteen were built for the Navy between 1943 and 1946,  with five additional units, sometimes called the Mispillion class, built to the slightly larger Type T3-S2-A3 design.

Four of the Cimarrons were converted to escort carriers in 1942; two others were sunk by enemy action.

Ships

Mispillion and Ashtabula subclasses

There is some controversy about the MARAD Type T3-S2-A3 oilers being a class of their own, the Mispillion class. Adding to the confusion, some sources refer to the 18 war-construction repeat Cimarrons as the Ashtabula class.

The argument for separation of Ashtabula, Caloosahatchee, and Canisteo as a separate class  from Mispillion, Navasota, Passumpsic, Pawcatuck, and Waccamaw can be made by comparing the actual design and equipment of the two groups. The Ashtabulas and Mispillions are quite different in appearance and UNREP equipment. The three Ashtabulas have a fully enclosed well deck, no exterior deck walkways on the forward superstructure, a tunnel through the forward superstructure to allow the movement of cargo to the forward deck, two sets of STREAM gear, the second being forward of the forward superstructure, and no helo deck on the bow. The Mispillions have none of these features.

Jumboization

From 1964 through 1967, eight of the T3 type oilers were "jumboized" in order to increase their capacity to 180,000 barrels, which the Navy considered the amount necessary to support a supercarrier and its jet air wing's fuel needs. The conversion of the Mispillion sub-class was designed under project SCB 223, while that of the Ashtabula sub-class was designed under SCB 706. This jumboization was done by cutting the ships in two with cutting torches, then the aft section was pulled away, and new mid-body moved in and welded to the bows and sterns. After many other cutting and welding modifications a new long ship was created; a helipad was also fitted forward on the five Mispillions. Ashtabula, Caloosahatchee and Canisteo were jumboized after the five Mispillions and were given a limited capacity for ammunition and dry stores as well as a new midships superstructure and full scantlings, whereas AO-105 through 109 retained their shelter-deck configuration.

Importance
The US Navy's mastery of underway replenishment and its ability to refuel the fleet at sea without returning to port was a major factor in its successful operations against the Japanese during the Second World War. As the largest and fastest of the Navy's oilers, the Cimarrons were the principal class employed in direct support of the task forces.  Many of the Cimarron class continued to sustain this function through the Korean and Vietnam wars as well, with the "jumbos" serving right up to the Persian Gulf War.

US Navy captains who had flight status ("wings") were eligible to command aircraft carriers, but it was a prerequisite that the officer in question first have a "deep-draft" command; accordingly the Navy assigned these officers to oilers which had a similar draft.

References

Notes

Sources

 

The T2, T2-A and T3-S2-A1 Type Maritime Commission Tankers 1939 – 1945

Auxiliary replenishment ship classes
Auxiliary ship classes of the United States Navy
 
 Cimarron class oiler
 Cimarron class oiler
 Cimarron class oiler
 Cimarron class oiler